Milner Field was a large country house near Saltaire in West Yorkshire, England built in 1872 for Titus Salt Junior, youngest son of the Yorkshire wool merchant and philanthropist Sir Titus Salt and demolished in the 1950s.  The house was situated at the edge of the village of Gilstead, near Bingley, overlooking the Aire Valley in the direction of Salt senior's model village of Saltaire and Salts Mill.

The Salt years 
Titus Salt Junior purchased an existing Elizabethan manor house named Milner Field and surrounding land in or around 1870. The original house was demolished, and the new Milner Field was built. The entrance steps and gateway of the original were retained to form an entrance to the new croquet lawn. Salt employed a little known Victorian architect,  Thomas Harris, to design and build the new house and no expense was spared obtaining the best stone, wood and other materials. A top London landscape gardener, Robert Marnock, was used and the house and grounds were completed in 1872 and Titus Junior and his family moved in. He was married to Catherine, from the Crossley textile and carpet dynasty of West Yorkshire.

Royal visits and a sad ending 
After settling in, the Salt family's fortunes began to suffer. However, they were still an influential family; well connected and known for their lavish socialising. There were two Royal visits to the house - in 1882 and 1887 - not long before his death. Titus Jr had pre-existing medical issues; and in 1887 lost money on the Great Exhibition of the North - a Saltaire exhibition intended to rival the extravagant Crystal Palace exhibition in London. Although a modest success, the event barely covered his own outlay. Further failed business ventures in South America, trying to build on the Alpaca / Mohair trade, brought further heavy losses due to import taxes. In 1887, he left the mill early and returned to Milner Field via the Coach Road from Saltaire, and collapsed in the billiard room of the grand building. Although found, he could not be saved and was pronounced dead.

The Roberts years 
Catherine continued to live there until the turn of the century, but with mounting debts she sold to the wealthy Roberts family, who later bequeathed Roberts Park to Saltaire which still exists to this day. When Sir James Roberts was made a baronet, he chose the title "of Milner Field".They were followed by another family who made their wealth from the burgeoning West Yorkshire textile trade, and became similarly cursed over their years at the house and brought a touch of national  to proceedings. The Roberts family seemed to suffer as much tragedy as many of the other owners combined.

The Gates years 
When the Roberts family left, the Gates family - again with connections to the mill at Saltaire - became the next owners in 1922. Again another family was met with bad luck and tragedy. Ernest Gates lost his wife almost as soon as they moved in, and he himself met his demise by a scratch from a rosebush on the estate (or a blow to the leg from a golf club according to other sources).

The Hollins years 
The Gates family were followed by the final owners - the Hollins. There was to be no change in fortune, and by 1926 - 54 years after the joyful arrival of the first inhabitants - Milner Field was vacated. Arthur Remington Hollins must have been one of the most unfortunate of all the deceased - he died from hiccups!

An auction was organised, with lavish literature, but folklore was still strong in those days and nobody wanted to live in a place with such a tragic reputation that reflected the Gothic greyness of the grand house. It went unsold.

Deserted - the final years 
Another auction arranged for 1930 again failed to result in a sale, and at this point, with the house now owned by the Salts Mill estate, the roof was removed to avoid paying rates (local taxes). The building deteriorated, and was plundered by the mill for stone for repairs, and by locals for any souvenir of grandeur they could find. In the years leading up to World War II nature began to reclaim the land around the house and it became a shambolic shadow of its former glory. Tales of ghosts and misfortune saw the neglect hasten, and the estate was billeted by the Home Guard (Bingley) who used the shell of the building for grenade practice.

After World War II, more years of neglect as the country rebuilt from the ravages of war. It became a playground for local children, but the dangerous state of the place led to the decision to attempt demolition. In the 1950's there was a failed explosion that barely made a mark, such was the solid nature of the original build. There has been mention of a fire, but whether this was an isolated incident or designed to strip the house of remaining timber prior to a second explosion attempt is unknown. Even the second attempt with dynamite was only a partial success, and the remaining tall walls and towers were pulled down with rope and chain, and left where they fell.

Stone and brick was plundered for years, save for the large pieces that were far too heavy to move. Cellars remained intact, and became a new playground for local children. The once grand gardens, stables and conservatory were consumed by leaves, new growth and more leaves, and so the cycle continued through the decades that followed.

Recent times 
The coach road that existed between the South (originally Eastern) and North (originally Western) lodges became open land - well kept and a pleasant country walk for local families. The lodges - originally gatehouses to the estate - became inhabited again, and by the new millennium people walking the coach road had little idea of the grand site that once prospered just out of site. The original gothic archway fell in the 70s. Children used the site for mountain biking, social drinking and sadly, vandalism, blissfully unaware of what once stood beneath their feet.

The present day 
Interest in the site was renewed partly by the obvious links to the World Heritage Site at Saltaire, but also due to the painstakingly researched book "The Lost Country House of Titus Salt Junior" by  Richard Lee-Van den Daele and R. David Beale. In 2022, an enthusiastic group of locals started to safely uncover parts of the perimeter of the building that remains. The conservatory floor was swept, and original features of the building have been uncovered. The group's aim is to expose (safely) as much of the outline of the remains so as to give an idea of the shape and scale of the house, the conservatory, the terraces and the kitchens and servant's quarters as possible, to preserve for the enjoyment of others.  Concern about the volunteers' work has been expressed by a local history group.

In literature
Frances Brody's 2022 novel A Mansion for Murder (Piatkus), the 13th in her Kate Shackleton series, is set in and around Milner Field in 1930.

References

Further reading

External links

Shipley, West Yorkshire
Country houses in West Yorkshire
Houses completed in 1872
British country houses destroyed in the 20th century
Demolished buildings and structures in England